RBSD may mean:
Rosendale-Brandon School District, Wisconsin
Rose Bud School District, Arkansas
Reality-Based Self-Defense
Robert Busch School of Design, a school of Kean University